Jacqueline Moody is a writer, editor and producer. She is Founder and Chief Executive of YadaYadaCo., which provides editorial, production and content development services in the children’s media space. She is a co-founder and writer for the television show WordWorld, which airs in over 90 countries around the globe.

Career
Moody studied creative writing and playwriting at Lehman College, City University of New York. In addition to her work in television, she also worked as an editor and writer for Soundprints, a children’s book publisher, serving clients including Disney and the Smithsonian Institution.

WordWorld
Moody was co-creator, head writer, and executive producer of WordWorld, a Dove Foundation and Academy Award winning children’s television program that emphasizes the importance of literacy from an early age. In 2005, WordWorld was the recipient of IKEA after their study concluded that the show “significantly strengthens early literacy skills in preschoolers, providing the building blocks essential for learning how to read.”.

The series premiered on September 3, 2007, and ended on January 17, 2011, having run for three seasons, containing 80 episodes in total.  Peg + Cat replaced re-runs of WordWorld in the PBS Kids lineup in October, 2013.

References

Living people
American television producers
American women television producers
Year of birth missing (living people)
21st-century American women